The Hundred-Year Christmas is a fantasy novel by David Morrell, who is best known for being the creator of John Rambo in his earlier novel First Blood. The Hundred-Year Christmas was first published in 1983 by Donald M. Grant in an edition of 700 copies, which were signed and numbered.

Origin
The novel was originally written as a Christmas present for Morrell's two children, and the children in the novel are named after Morell's son and daughter.

Plot
The novel concerns the friendship between Father Christmas, who lives for 100 years, and Father Time, who lives for only one. Each year Santa Claus watches a new version of his friend grow old and die, before being replaced; however, Santa's hundred years is up and it is now his turn to find a replacement. If he fails then no one will be around to take care of the infant Father Time and time itself will stop.

Reception
The Hundred-Year Christmas was nominated for a World Fantasy Award in 1984 for best short story.

Notes

References

1983 American novels
American fantasy novels
Santa Claus in fiction
Christmas novels
Donald M. Grant, Publisher books